Samuel S. Bevard ( – March 29, 1940) was an American politician, farmer, and canner from Maryland. He served as a member of the Maryland House of Delegates, representing Harford County, from 1892 to 1896.

Early life
Samuel S. Bevard was born in Harford County, Maryland around 1854 to Wakeman H. Bevard. He studied at public schools and attended Bel Air Academy.

Career
Bevard worked as a canner and farmer. He was also connected with road and farmers' conventions.

Bevard was a Democrat. Bevard served as a member of the Maryland House of Delegates, representing Harford County, from 1892 to 1896.

He later worked as a clerk in the state's treasurer office.

Personal life
Bevard married Lida A. Buckingham. She died in 1938.

Bevard died on March 29, 1940, at Havre de Grace Hospital. He was interred at Abingdon Methodist Cemetery.

References

1850s births
Year of birth missing
1940 deaths
People from Harford County, Maryland
Democratic Party members of the Maryland House of Delegates
Farmers from Maryland